Cattermole is a surname. Notable people with the surname include:

 Eva Cattermole (1849–1896), Italian writer and poet
 George Cattermole (1800–1868), British painter and illustrator
 Lee Cattermole (born 1988), English footballer
 Paul Cattermole (born 1977), English singer